Mark John ("MJ") Hibbett (born 19 June 1970) is an English guitarist singer-songwriter, often compared to Billy Bragg and Richard Digance.

With his band The Validators, Hibbett came to widespread online notice in 2000 with "Hey Hey 16K", an ode to the ZX Spectrum and other home microcomputers of the 1980s. The song gained larger acclaim when an animated music video for the track, created by Rob Manuel, was released in 2004. Hibbett later collaborated with Manuel, who directed the music video for his song "The Gay Train".

In 2004, Hibbett gained national exposure in the United Kingdom, on the Steve Lamacq show on BBC 6 Music, by regularly performing "The Fair Play Trophy (Again)", a song whose lyrics were updated for each rendition to reflect the then-ongoing events of the UEFA European Football Championship.

Hibbett's songs have mostly been released on his own record label, Artists Against Success. He is an advocate of the ukulele, which he has used for solo performances.

Hibbett lives and works in London, where he is employed as a database administrator. He holds master's degrees from City University and De Montfort University and attended Deacon's School. He was awarded a doctorate in philosophy at the University of the Arts London in comics studies, focusing on Doctor Doom.

References

External links
MJ Hibbett homepage and blog
MJ Hibbett on MySpace
MJ Hibbett discography

1970 births
Living people
English pop guitarists
English rock guitarists
English male guitarists
English male singer-songwriters
English bloggers
Alumni of City, University of London
People from Peterborough
Alumni of De Montfort University
People educated at Deacon's School
Musicians from Cambridgeshire
21st-century English singers
British male bloggers
21st-century British guitarists
21st-century British male singers